Brand Nubian is an American hip hop group from New Rochelle, New York, composed of three emcees (Grand Puba, Sadat X and Lord Jamar), and formerly three DJs (DJ Alamo, DJ Sincere, and DJ Stud Doogie). Their debut studio album, One for All (1990), is one of the most popular and acclaimed alternative hip hop albums of the 1990s, known for socially conscious and political lyrics inspired by the teachings of The Nation of Gods and Earths. In 2008, About.com placed the group on its list of the 25 Greatest Rap Groups of All Time.

History

1989–1992
Brand Nubian formed in 1989 and their first single, "Brand Nubian," was released in 1989. Signed to Elektra Records by A&R man Dante Ross, their debut album, One For All, was released in 1990. Generally acclaimed, the album drew fire for militant Five-Percenter rhetoric on tracks such as "Drop the Bomb" and "Wake Up". The controversy helped selling in excess of 400,000 copies. A version of the Fab Five Freddy-directed video of the single "Wake Up," featuring a black man in white-face makeup, was banned from MTV. On that channel and from official WEA sources, this image was replaced by a Baptist preacher. The singles "Slow Down," "All for One," and "Wake Up" all became hits on Billboard’s Hot Rap Tracks chart in 1991.

Shortly after the group's debut release, Grand Puba quarreled with Sadat X and Lord Jamar, and he left the group, along with DJ Alamo, to pursue a solo career. Following this, Lord Jamar and Sadat X asked DJ Sincere to join the group in 1992. The same year, Puba released his solo debut, Reel to Reel.

At the end of 1992, Brand Nubian released the single "Punks Jump up to Get Beat Down". The track created controversy because of its homophobic content such as Sadat X's line "I can freak, fly, flow, fuck up a faggot/I don't understand their ways; I ain't down with gays". Despite this, the single charted on the Billboard Hot 100 at number 77. Later versions omitted the line and replaced it with different lyrics, including the version on the greatest hits compilation The Very Best of Brand Nubian.

1992–1996
In early 1993, Brand Nubian released their second album, In God We Trust, which included the song "Punks Jump Up to Get Beat Down" and the number 92 Hot-100 single "Love Me or Leave Me Alone." That same year, the group's song "Lick Dem Muthaphuckas" was released as part of the Menace II Society soundtrack.

Brand Nubian's next release, Everything is Everything, was released in November 1994. Reviews were mixed and sales mediocre, despite the top-40 Hot Rap Tracks singles "Word is Bond" and "Hold On". In 1995, Brand Nubian broke up and its members started solo careers in music and television. That same year, Grand Puba released his second solo album, 2000, featuring another Billboard Hot 100 single, "I Like It (I Wanna Be Where You Are),"  and Sadat X released his first solo album, Wild Cowboys, in 1996.

1997–2000
Brand Nubian's original members reunited in 1997 and contributed "A Child is Born" to the Soul in the Hole soundtrack. In 1997, "Keep It Bubblin'" appeared on the Money Talks soundtrack. In 1998, Brand Nubian released the album Foundation on Arista/BMG Records. It featured contributions from producers such as DJ Premier, Buckwild, Lord Finesse, and Diamond D. The lead single "Don't Let It Go to Your Head" became, at number 54, the group's highest-charting single on the Hot 100. In 1999, Grand Puba and Sadat X were featured on "Once Again", from the first Handsome Boy Modeling School record. In 2000, Brand Nubian once again teamed up with Buckwild of D.I.T.C., releasing the single "Rockin' It," after which the members, once again, pursued their solo projects. Sadat X released a solo EP in 2000, The State of New York vs. Derek Murphy.

2001–present
Grand Puba released his third solo effort, Understand This, in 2001, which received little attention. Brand Nubian reunited once again in 2004 for their fifth album, Fire in the Hole, released by Babygrande Records. Sadat X released another solo effort in 2005, titled Experience & Education, to mostly positive reviews. Jamar pursued his acting career, appearing on an episode of The Sopranos, as well as episodes of Oz, Third Watch, and Law & Order. Lord Jamar released his first solo album, The 5% Album, in June 2006, on Babygrande Records. Sadat X's third full-length album Black October came out in October 2006. In 2007, the group released an album titled Time's Runnin' Out, containing material recorded ten years earlier during the sessions for the 1998 Foundation album.

Members
 Grand Puba (1989–1991, 1997–2000, 2003–present)
 Sadat X (1989–1995, 1997–2000, 2003–present)
 Lord Jamar (1989–1995, 1997–2000, 2003–present)
 DJ Alamo (1989–1991, 1997–2000)
 DJ Sincere (1989–1995)
 DJ Stud Doogie

Discography

Studio albums
 One for All  (1990)
 In God We Trust (1993)
 Everything Is Everything (1994)
 Foundation (1998)
 Fire in the Hole (2004)
 Time's Runnin' Out (2007)

References

External links 

 Brand Nubian interview with Scion Broadband
 Hip Hop Icon Series: Brand Nubian

Arista Records artists
East Coast hip hop groups
Elektra Records artists
Five percenters
Musical groups established in 1989
Musical groups from New York (state)